QSC AG was founded in Cologne on 5 August 1999 by Bernd Schlobom and Gerd Eickers as the first German and one of the first European HDSL internet service provider. The company went public on 19 April 2000 in Frankfurt Stock Exchange (at the Neuer Market).

Cologne-based QSC AG was a nationwide telecommunications provider in Germany with its own DSL network. It supplied broadband communication products such as leased lines. It was a member of the TecDAX 30, Germany's 30 leading public technology companies.

Today the company operates under the name q-beyond and offers mainly IT-Consulting services.

External links

Official website q-beyond

References 

 Foundation history
 Company data Frankfurt Stock Exchange
 Annual report 2021

Internet service providers of Germany
Companies based in Cologne
German brands